The Odaigahara salamander (Hynobius boulengeri) is a species of salamander in the family Hynobiidae. It is endemic to Japan. Its natural habitats are temperate forests, rivers, and freshwater springs. This species is threatened by habitat loss.

References

Hynobius
Amphibians described in 1912
Endemic amphibians of Japan
Taxonomy articles created by Polbot